Jan Daněk (born 22 November 1982) is a Czech former footballer who played as a defender. He played in the Czech First League for Baník Ostrava. He is the son of Václav Daněk, who played football for Czechoslovakia as a striker.

References

External links

1982 births
Living people
Czech footballers
FC Baník Ostrava players
FK Viktoria Žižkov players
FK Dukla Prague players

Association football defenders